"Lodi" is a song written by John Fogerty and performed by Creedence Clearwater Revival. Recorded in March 1969, it was released in April, four months before the album, as the B-side of "Bad Moon Rising", the lead single from Green River.

After playing in local bars, the narrator finds himself stranded and unable to raise bus or train fare to leave. Fogerty later said he had never actually visited Lodi before writing this song, and simply picked it for the song because it had "the coolest sounding name." The song's chorus, "Oh Lord, stuck in Lodi again," has been the theme of several city events in Lodi.

The song's arrangement includes a change of key in the final verse of the track, emphasising the melancholy drama of the lyric, "If I only had a dollar for every song I sung...."

Reception
Billboard described the single as having "an easy beat," being as powerful as its flip side "Bad Moon Rising" and as having a similar feel to Creedence Clearwater Revival's earlier single "Proud Mary."  Cash Box similarly described it as "powerhouse material" that is similar to and as strong as the group's previous single "Proud Mary."

Songwriter's assessment
Fogerty stated, "On 'Lodi', I saw a much older person than I was, 'cause it is sort of a tragic telling. A guy is stuck in a place where people really don't appreciate him. Since I was at the beginning of a good career, I was hoping that that wouldn't happen to me."

Cover versions
The song has been covered by many musicians including: 
Advance Base
Tesla
Emmylou Harris
Amy Ray
Shawn Colvin
Tom Jones
Buck Owens
Jeffrey Foucault
The Flying Burrito Brothers
Ronnie Hawkins
Smokie
Dan Penn
Also in 1969, Al Wilson peaked at #67 on the Hot 100 with his version.
The Blue Aeroplanes
Tim Armstrong
FIDLAR
Freddie King
The Italian band Stormy Six
Bo Diddley
The Brandos
Eric Church
Lobo
In 1992 a free translation was a small hit as "Rocker in Holland" for Dutch singer Jan Rot.

References

1969 singles
Songs written by John Fogerty
Creedence Clearwater Revival songs
John Fogerty songs
Lodi, California
Song recordings produced by John Fogerty
Songs about California
Fantasy Records singles
1969 songs